Swad or SWAD may refer to:

Special Warfare Aviation Detachments
Semantic Web Advanced Development, an EU project
SWAD (software)
Swad, a resident of Swadlincote
Antonio Swad, the founder of Pizza Patrón chain
Stephen Swad, a CEO of Rosetta Stone company
Swimmers With a Disability, a category of swimming sports events
SWAD, the main food brand of Raja Foods LLC